Inchcape plc is a British multinational automotive distribution, retail and services company headquartered in London. An outgrowth of Calcutta-based Mackinnon Mackenzie Company, Inchcape has operations in 32 countries across Asia, Australia, Europe, Africa and South America.

Inchcape is listed on the London Stock Exchange and is a constituent of the FTSE 250 Index.

History

1847–1950 
In 1847, William Mackinnon and Robert Mackenzie formed the Mackinnon Mackenzie Company (MMC), a general merchanting partnership based in Calcutta. In 1856 Mackinnon formed the Calcutta and Burma Steam Navigation Company to carry post to the region: the Company appointed MMC as their agents, secured contracts to transport British troops from Ceylon to India during the Indian Mutiny of 1857 and in 1862 floated on the London Stock Exchange under the name British India Steam Navigation Company.

In 1874, James Lyle MacKay joined Mackinnon and Mackenzie in Calcutta and by 1914 was the sole surviving senior partner in MMC. Largely responsible for solving India's currency problems and for the adoption of the Gold Standard, he was given a peerage by King George V for his services to industry in 1911. He chose the title "Baron Inchcape, of Strathnaver in the County of Sutherland", after the Inchcape Rock, which lies off Strathnaver and Arbroath (his birthplace) in Scotland, a prominent landmark which he had known well from sailing on voyages with his shipmaster father. Lord Inchcape was later created The 1st Viscount Inchcape in 1924, and was further advanced in the Peerage of the United Kingdom as The 1st Earl of Inchcape in 1929.

1950–1990 

By the 1950s, the Inchcape family had diverse interests around the world. This period brought new legislation and tax laws and, under The 3rd Earl of Inchcape, the family's many interests, including MMC, were consolidated into Inchcape and Company. In 1958 Inchcape and Company became a public company and offered twenty five per cent of its equity for sale on the London Stock Exchange.

Inchcape's growth was largely due to a series of mergers and acquisitions, including the merger with Borneo Company Limited in 1967, which almost doubled the company's size by adding Hong Kong, Malaysia, Canada, Singapore, Brunei and Thailand to the operation. In 1971, Millars Timber & Trading Company in Western Australia was purchased.

In 1972, Dodwell & Company was acquired, adding extensive shipping, motors and business machine trading in the Far East. Dodwell & Company gave Inchcape further interests in this region, which it maintained as quasi-independent companies, rather than forming one large entity. Dodwell & Company was founded in Shanghai in 1858, and by the 1970s had established extensive businesses in shipping, motors, and business-machine trading in Hong Kong, Japan and many other Far Eastern ports and cities.

Mann Egerton, acquired in 1973, laid the foundations for Inchcape's motor-distribution business. Founded at the end of the 19th century in Norwich by an electrical engineer and an early motoring pioneer, Mann Egerton sold cars manufactured by De Dion-Bouton, Renault and Daimler at the turn of the century initially from branches in the eastern counties of England. By the 1970s, Mann Egerton distributed British Leyland cars, as well as an extensive range of luxury cars. Inchcape bought Joska Bourgeois's Japanese car distribution business, the International Motor Company, for £14.6 million in 1979.

Reincorporated as Inchcape plc in 1981, the company acquired during the 1980s several petrol, textile, electronic and mineral testing and inspection companies and formed a specific testing business stream. This business stream kept on growing due to the acquisition of the Caleb Brett group, SEMKO and various others, such as ETL Testing Laboratories.

By 1989, the motors division of Inchcape was contributing two-thirds of group turnover and 53.6 percent of group profits, the greater part contributed by Toyota.

1990–2000 

Under the chairmanship of George Turnbull, Inchcape had reinforced in the 1980s its concentration on its core businesses. The key businesses at that time were organised into three main areas: services, marketing and distribution, and resources. The service businesses consisted of buying, insurance, inspection and testing, and shipping. The marketing and distribution businesses covered business machines, consumer and industrial services, and motors. The resource-based businesses covered tea and timber.

A combination of factors plunged Inchcape into its two most difficult years ever, 1994 and 1995. Difficult economic conditions in some of the company's key markets – particularly in Western Europe and Hong Kong – dampened consumer spending, while the strength of the yen made Inchcape's Japanese products, notably the Toyota motor vehicles, less attractive than those of competitors based outside Japan. In certain areas such as marketing, Inchcape had also become a more bureaucratic organisation than in the past, and had lost touch with some of the local markets it served.

A new management team determined that Inchcape had to focus on its core international distribution businesses to turn things around and began making significant business divestments, including selling the Bain Hogg insurance brokerage subsidiary (formed by the merger of Inchcape's brokerage operation with Bain Clarkson, and the Hogg Group in 1994 and ranked the eleventh largest broker in the world in 1995) to the Aon Corporation in the United States for £160 million in 1996. In the same year the testing service division was part of a management buy-out by Charterhouse Development Capital and renamed Intertek Testing Services.

In March 1998 spurred by the Asian economic crisis, Inchcape announced, that it would focus exclusively on worldwide car distribution, the most successful part of the group. One of the first major sectors to go was the company's Russian soft-drink bottling business. Inchcape sold that part of their operations to The Coca-Cola Company for US$87 million. The sales of bottling businesses in South America, marketing services in Asia and the Middle East, the global shipping business – Inchcape Shipping Services (ISS) – and the Asia-Pacific Office Automation business were some of the wide range of divestments that quickly followed. In July 1999 the new motors-only Inchcape was officially born.

2000–present 
In June 2000 Peter Johnson became chief executive officer. The economic recovery in the Far East helped restore profits as did the sale of Inchcape's forty nine per cent stake in Toyota GB to Toyota in 2000. In 2006 André Lacroix took over as CEO and in 2007 Inchcape acquired European Motor Holdings, a leading European motor retailer. Then Stefan Bomhard took over as CEO in January 2015.

In December 2022, Inchcape announced its £1.3 billion GBP acquisition of Latin America’s largest independent automotive distributor, Derco, had been approved by Peruvian authorities.

Operations
As of 2021, Inchcape operates in these countries:

 Europe
 United Kingdom
 Belgium
 Luxembourg
 Poland
 Lithuania
 Latvia
 Estonia
 Finland
 Romania
 Bulgaria
 North Macedonia
 Greece
 Russia
 Americas & Africa
 El Salvador
 Costa Rica
 Panama
 Colombia
 Ecuador
 Peru
 Chile
 Argentina
 Uruguay
 Djibouti
 Ethiopia
 Kenya
 Asia-Pacific
 Hong Kong
 Thailand
 Brunei
 Macau
 Singapore
 Guam
 Saipan
 Australia

References

Bibliography

External links
Official site
Inchcape Fleet Solutions
Inchcape Retail UK
Yahoo profile

Wholesalers of the United Kingdom
Companies listed on the London Stock Exchange
Auto dealerships of the United Kingdom
Business services companies established in 1847
Retail companies established in 1847
British brands
Companies based in the City of Westminster
1847 establishments in British India
Indian companies established in 1847